Lu Ruihua (born November 1938 in Chaozhou, Guangdong) a Chinese politician who served as Governor of Guangdong.

He joined the Chinese Communist Party in June 1972.

References 

1938 births
Living people
Governors of Guangdong
Politicians from Chaozhou
People's Republic of China politicians from Guangdong
Chinese Communist Party politicians from Guangdong